Louis Casimer Jankowski (June 27, 1931 – March 21, 2010) was a Canadian professional ice hockey forward and scout who played 131 games in the National Hockey League with the Detroit Red Wings and Chicago Black Hawks between 1951 and 1955. The rest of his career, which lasted from 1951 to 1969, was mainly spent in the minor Western Hockey League.

Early life
Louis Casimer Jankowski was born on June 27, 1931, in Regina, Saskatchewan, the fourth of six sons to a Polish Catholic mother, Anna Jankowski. Anna, her husband, and three sons had immigrated to Canada in 1927 from Świdnik, Poland. The family later moved to Hamilton, Ontario.

Playing career
Jankowski spent three seasons playing for the Oshawa Generals of the OHA. He played alongside Alex Delvecchio, where the duo became known for their offensive scoring punch.

A versatile forward who could play both the right wing and center positions, along with an ability to score profusely, Jankowski won the Eddie Powers Memorial Trophy as a member of the Generals, recording 65 goals, 59 assists and 124 points during the 1950-51 season.

Jankowski earned a tryout with the NHL’s Detroit Red Wings, where he reunited with Delvecchio. While Delvecchio was established as a mainstay in the Wings lineup, Jankowski's tenure with the club was seen as a disappointment, managing only a goal and two assists in 22 games.

In the summer of 1953, the Red Wings sold Jankowski's contract to the Chicago Black Hawks. Jankowski displayed some of his scoring touch, notching 15 goals in 68 games, despite limited playing time.

Jankowski's NHL career ended with 19 goals, 18 assists and 15 penalty minutes in 127 career games played.

After other NHL clubs showed no interest in offering a contract, Jankowski signed with the Calgary Stampeders of the Western Hockey League, where he would reestablish his offensive game. Jankowski led the league in goals during his first three seasons, scoring a career high 57 goals in the 1960-61 season.

Jankowski was named to the WHL All-Star Team  four times between 1959 and 1963, earning the Leader Cup award as the WHL's Most Valuable Player in 1961.

Jankowski led the league in goals with 41, during the 1963-64 season as a member of the Denver Invaders, where he was the recipient of the Fred J. Hume Cup as the league's most gentlemanly player.

Jankowski would play for various minor league clubs, before announcing his retirement after 18 professional seasons.

Jankowski found a second career as a scout in 1972. He would work for the St. Louis Blues, Washington Capitals, the NHL Central Scouting Bureau, and the New York Rangers, for whom he was employed for 15 years, retiring from the organization in 1993.

Personal life
Jankowski was married twice. His first marriage was to Helen Kelly, the sister of Hall of Famer Red Kelly.

Jankowski has three children. His son Ryan previously served as the assistant general manager of the New York Islanders.

His grandson, Mark Jankowski is a forward for the Nashville Predators.

Career statistics

Regular season and playoffs

Awards and achievements

Eddie Powers Memorial Trophy (OHA/OHL Leading Scorer) (1950–51)
WHL Prairie Division First All-Star Team (1959)
WHL First All-Star Team (1960, 1961, 1964)
Leader Cup (MVP - WHL) (1961)
WHL Second All-Star Team (1962)
Fred J. Hume Cup (Most Gentlemanly Player - WHL) (1964)

Records
OHA - Most points in one season (65G, 59A, 124P in 54 games)
WHL - Most goals in one season (57G in 69 games)

References

External links
 
 Obituary

1931 births
2010 deaths
Amarillo Wranglers players
Buffalo Bisons (AHL) players
Calgary Stampeders (WHL) players
Canadian expatriate ice hockey players in the United States
Canadian ice hockey right wingers
Canadian people of Polish descent
Chicago Blackhawks players
Denver Invaders players
Detroit Red Wings players
Edmonton Flyers (WHL) players
Ice hockey people from Saskatchewan
Sportspeople from Regina, Saskatchewan
Indianapolis Capitals players
New York Rangers scouts
Oshawa Generals players
Phoenix Roadrunners (WHL) players
St. Louis Blues scouts
St. Louis Flyers players
Victoria Maple Leafs players
Washington Capitals scouts